Pereshchepnoye is a rural locality (a selo) in Filonovskoye Rural Settlement, Bogucharsky District, Voronezh Oblast, Russia. The population was 182 as of 2010. There are 5 streets.

Geography 
Pereshchepnoye is located 11 km north of Boguchar (the district's administrative centre) by road. Filonovo is the nearest rural locality.

References 

Rural localities in Bogucharsky District